In enzymology, a tropinone reductase I is an enzyme that catalyzes the chemical reaction

tropine + NADP+  tropinone + NADPH + H+

Thus, the two substrates of this enzyme are tropine and NADP+, whereas its 3 products are tropinone, NADPH, and H+.

This enzyme belongs to the family of oxidoreductases, specifically those acting on the CH-OH group of donor with NAD+ or NADP+ as acceptor. The systematic name of this enzyme class is tropine:NADP+ 3alpha-oxidoreductase. Other names in common use include tropine dehydrogenase, tropinone reductase (ambiguous), and TR-I. This enzyme participates in alkaloid biosynthesis ii.

References

 
 
 
 

EC 1.1.1
NADPH-dependent enzymes
Enzymes of known structure